is a mountain located on the border between Aichi and Nagano Prefectures, with its highest point on the Aichi side. The mountain is within the borders of the Tenryū-Okumikawa Quasi-National Park. During wintertime, the area hosts a popular ski resort.

See also 
 Tenryū-Okumikawa Quasi-National Park

External links
Topographical Map 

Mountains of Aichi Prefecture
Mountains of Nagano Prefecture